Mayurjharna Elephant Reserve   (henceforth MER) is an elephant reserve in Eastern India. The reserve is located over parts of Paschim Medinipur district, Jhargram district and Bankura district of West Bengal, India. The elephant population in MER increased from 47 in 1987 to 118 in 2010. The reserve is declared on 24 October 2002 by the Government of West Bengal.

The area consists of Kankrajhore, Mayurjharna, Banspahari and Bhulabheda Forest Blocks of West Midnapore Division and Popo, Barudi, Quilapal (P) etc. Forest Blocks of Kangsabati Soil Conservation - II, Searbinda, Udalchua, Jalpukuria and Belpahari Forest Blocks of West Midnapore Division and Quilapal (P), Nanna, Dhadka and Quchipara Forest Blocks of Kangsabati Soil Conservation Division - II and Ranibundh, Motgoda (P), Chendopathar, etc. Forest Blocks of Bankura (South) Division.

References

Protected areas of West Bengal
Tourist attractions in Paschim Medinipur district
Tourist attractions in Bankura district
2002 establishments in West Bengal
Protected areas established in 2002
Elephant reserves of India